Callen-Lorde Community Health Center is a primary care center located at 356 West 18th Street in New York City, New York. Callen-Lorde also provides comprehensive mental health services at The Thea Spyer Center, located at 230 West 17th Street. Callen-Lorde is dedicated to providing medical health care to the city's LGBTQ population without regard to ability to pay. It is named in honor of Michael Callen and Audre Lorde.

The facility offers a variety of services, including dental care, HIV/STD testing and treatment, mental health services, women's health services, transgender hormone therapy, and medical case management support. Callen-Lorde is also home to the Health Outreach to Teens (HOTT) program, which serves youth between the ages of 13 and 22 in an on-premises clinic and a fully equipped medical van.

Callen-Lorde is the only primary care center in New York City created specifically to serve LGBTQ communities. Callen-Lorde's grassroots heritage dates back nearly 50 years to the St. Mark's Community Clinic and the Gay Men's Health Project, two volunteer-based clinics that provided screening and treatment for sexually-transmitted diseases. These clinics merged in 1983 to form Community Health Project, a mostly volunteer-staffed, episodic care program housing the nation's first community-based HIV clinic. The center has grown both in size and scope since these early days: from a 2,500 square-foot space inside of the Lesbian, Gay, Bisexual & Transgender Community Center on West 13th Street that primarily worked with HIV and other sexually transmitted diseases, into a comprehensive primary care center housed in more than 3 locations, including the 6-floor, 27,000 square-foot 18th Street facility that it moved into in 1997.

In 2007, it was among over 530 New York City arts and social service institutions to receive part of a $30 million grant from the Carnegie Corporation, which was made possible through a donation by New York City mayor Michael Bloomberg.

In 2015, during National Health Center Week, Callen-Lorde was one of 266 health centers selected for Affordable Care Act funding as a Federally Qualified Health Center, for providing primary care to a medically underserved population. In a proclamation announcing these awards, President Obama declared, "This week, as we recognize the 50-year anniversary of the first community health centers being established in America, let us remember that health care is not a privilege for the few among us who can afford it, but a right for all Americans -- and let us recognize the vital role health centers across our country play in carrying us toward greater health for our people."

History
Callen-Lorde's grassroots heritage dates back nearly 50 years to the St. Mark's Community Clinic and the Gay Men's Health Project. In 1969, just shy of 6 months after Stonewall, two young doctors started the St. Marks Clinic (also known as 'St. Marks Free Clinic' and 'St. Marks Community Clinic) at 44 St. Marks Place, the epicenter of East Coast counter culture. The mission of the clinic was to provide free healthcare to young people and people in the neighborhood, who, at the time, consisted largely of 'hippies,' 'freaks,' and 'queers.' The majority of the patients were between 16 and 25 years of age, and came in droves for STI treatment, abscesses from needles, substance use detox, birth control, and mental health counseling.

The concept of this type of healthcare – the notion of healthcare as a human right, one to be provided without judgment, and without pay – was radical. While much else has changed, their ethos remains the same today.

In the early 1970s, a group of seven queer women banded together to create the Women's Health Collective – the "Oldest Lesbian Clinic in the Nation" at St. Marks. In the later 1970s, the Women's Collective expanded and took over St. Marks, building their own location on 2nd Avenue and 2nd Street. Their vision was to break down the barrier between provider and patient. They were anti-establishment, anti-racist, and rooted in health justice.

Meanwhile, in 1972, a group of three friends – Leonard Ebreo, Marc Rabinowitz, and Perry Brass – founded the Gay Men's Health Project Clinic (GMHP) at Liberation House (or 'Lib House') on 247 West 11th Street in Greenwich Village. Their purpose they decided was to start a lesbian and gay community drop-in center based on a therapeutic model. They signed a lease for the central storage area in the basement of this tenement. After the large response to holding an open community forum on gay men's health in the community room of the Washington Square United Methodist Church.

None of them had a background in healthcare, but they felt the need to reduce shame, fear and stigma about gay bodies and gay sex, which they knew were leading to poor health outcomes for themselves and their peers. It was the first clinic for gay men on the East Coast and the first group of any kind to use the words "gay men" in its name.

GMHP opened in an unfinished concrete basement, they put in a few lights and furnished it with folding chairs and a card table. They held forums with various speakers on educating men on their bodies, sexuality, emotional aspects, venereal diseases and the rise of venereal disease in the community (sexually transmitted infections, or STIs). Advocated for the importance of using condoms, to protect against STI's which were only previously associated with birth control. When in 1972 such an idea seemed almost ridiculous, it was important to get gay men to understand. They taught themselves how to swab, screen and diagnose STI's, and would refer patients who tested positive to licensed clinics. Many were referred to St. Marks, which would eventually lead to a more codified relationship between the two.

Both the Women's Health Collective and Gay Men's Health Project pioneered the idea that healthcare could not only be inclusive of queer people, but provided by queer people.

In 1983, to pool resources in response to the growing AIDS epidemic, the St. Marks Clinic merged with Gay Men's Health Project to create Community Health Project, Inc. (CHP). CHP took up a 2,500 square foot space (squatted) on the second floor at 208 West 13th Street in Greenwich Village – a building which would later become "The Center: The Lesbian, Gay, Bisexual and Transgender Community Center."

The 1980s were a devastating time, and CHP was seeing patients with HIV-related illness in droves. In 1985, with funding from the Robert Wood Johnson Foundation, CHP began operating as the nation's first community-based HIV clinic in conjunction with Bellevue Hospital, it also had a significant number of St. Vincent's staff as volunteers at the time as well. Later in cooperation with the Gender Identity Project, (GIP) initiated a partnership with CPH opened the cities first transgender medical clinic within its second floor site. In 1991 CPH opened HOTT, "Health Outreach To Teens", serving adolescent 13–20 at that time in the LGBTQ+ community with a variety of services. CHP not only treated patients with AIDS and AIDS-related complications, but created the "AIDS Assessment Program" – an innovative, first of its kind program to assess risk and help prevent transmission of HIV/AIDS.

In addition to testing, diagnosing, and treating illness, CHP had a goal to more proactively keep their communities healthy through primary care. However, the space in the center was not code compliant with the State Department of Health.  A primary care center required additional licensing, technology and space, and so, the decision was made to move once again and expand operations.

In 1996, with help from New York State, CHP purchased a 27,000 square foot abandoned building at 356 West 18th St in Chelsea and began a gut renovation. In 1998, under a new State Department of Health license, CHP became the "Michael Callen-Audre Lorde Community Health Center," dedicated to the memories of Michael Callen, HIV advocate, founding member of the a cappella group The Flirtations, and founder of the People with AIDS Coalition, and Audre Lorde, poet laureate of New York State, health and human rights activist, and breast cancer survivor.

Since 1998, they have continued to expand to meet the growing needs of the LGBTQ+ communities. They opened a dental clinic and care coordination program, and an onsite pharmacy. In 2014, they opened the Thea Spyer Center, a long-term mental health and sexual health clinic on 17th Street, and in 2016, a third primary care location in the South Bronx.

They added advocacy, policy, research and education – working to improve the health of LGBTQ+ people outside their doors and around the globe. And recently in 2019 – 50 years since their grassroots beginnings – they have expanded yet again, building a fourth location in downtown Brooklyn.

See also

 Michael Callen and Audre Lorde, for whom the organization is named.

References

Audre Lorde
LGBT health organizations in the United States
Healthcare in New York City
LGBT organizations based in New York City
Medical and health organizations based in New York City
Clinics in New York City
1998 establishments in New York City